Trissobrocha is a monotypic moth genus in the subfamily Arctiinae. Its single species, Trissobrocha eugraphica, is found in Australia, where it has been recorded from New South Wales and Queensland. Both the genus and species were first described by Turner in 1914.

References

Lithosiini
Monotypic moth genera
Moths of Australia